The 1995–96 Argentine Primera B Nacional was the tenth season of second division professional of football in Argentina. A total of 22 teams competed; the champion and runner-up were promoted to Argentine Primera División. It was the first season in which 3 points were awarded for a win instead of 2.

Club information

Apertura standings

Clausura standings

Overall standings

Promotion playoff
This leg was played between the Apertura Winner: Huracán Corrientes, and the Clausura Winner: Talleres (C). The winning team was declared champion and was automatically promoted to 1996–97 Primera División and the losing team played the Second Promotion Playoff.

|-
!colspan="5"|Promotion playoff

Second promotion playoff
The second promotion playoff or Torneo Reducido was played by the teams placed 3rd to 8th in the overall standings: Atlético Tucumán (3rd), Godoy Cruz (4th), Douglas Haig (5th), Instituto (6th), Unión (7th) and San Martín (SJ) (8th); the Promotion Playoff loser: Talleres (C); and the champion of Primera B Metropolitana:Sportivo Italiano. The winning team was promoted to 1996–97 Primera División.

Bracket

Note: The team in the first line plays at home the second leg.

Relegation

Note: Clubs with indirect affiliation with AFA are relegated to their respective league of his province according to the Argentine football league system, while clubs directly affiliated face relegation to Primera B Metropolitana. Clubs with direct affiliation are all from Greater Buenos Aires, with the exception of Newell's, Rosario Central, Central Córdoba and Argentino de Rosario, all from Rosario, and Unión and Colón from Santa Fe.

Relegation playoff matches
The relegation playoff matches or Torneo Reclasificatorio were played by the 3 teams placed 20th, 21st, and 22nd of the relegation table, and 15 teams from Primera B Metropolitana.

First round
In the first round played the 14 teams of Primera B Metropolitana.

Second round
In the second round played Almagro, runner-up of Primera B Metropolitana, and 7 teams that qualified from the First Round.

Third round
In the third round played the 3 teams placed 20th, 21st, and 22nd of the relegation table (Almirante Brown, Arsenal and Tigre), 4 teams that qualified from the Second Round and the best loser team placed in the overall standings of Primera B Metropolitana. Almirante Brown and Arsenal won their playoffs and remained in the Primera B Nacional. Sarmiento (J) and Almagro won their playoffs and were promoted to Primera B Nacional. Temperley was also promoted as the best loser placed in the overall standings of Primera B Metropolitana. Tigre was relegated to Primera B Metropolitana and San Miguel and Tristán Suárez remained on it.

See also
1995–96 in Argentine football

References

External links

Primera B Nacional seasons
Prim
1995 in South American football leagues
1996 in South American football leagues